Blacktoft is a village and civil parish in the East Riding of Yorkshire, England. Blacktoft lies within the Parliamentary constituency of Haltemprice and Howden an area that mainly consists of middle class suburbs, towns and villages. The area is affluent, placed as the 10th most affluent in the country in a 2003 Barclays Private Clients survey, and has one of the highest proportions of owner-occupiers in the country.

The civil parish of Blacktoft consists of the village of Blacktoft, Bellasize, Faxfleet and Yokefleet. According to the 2011 UK Census the parish had a population of 322, an increase of one on the 2001 UK census figure.

Blacktoft Sands RSPB reserve lies across the Ouse. The relatively new island of Whitton Island in the Humber Estuary falls partly within the parish.

History
According to A Dictionary of British Place Names, Blacktoft's joint derivation is from the Old English with Old Scandinavian for "dark coloured homestead." In  it was recorded as "Blaketofte."

In 1823 Blacktoft was in the wapentake of Howdenshire. It had a population of 268, with occupations including two farmers, a corn miller, blacksmith, tailor, shoemaker, and a carpenter, and a coal dealer who was also the landlord of the Bay Horse public house. Professions included a church curate. There were two surveyors of highways providing for the maintenance of parish roads. The village had a chapel and its own parish constable. At that time on the opposite bank of the Ouse, "great quantities" of river vessels were at times docked in what was considered good anchorage, and steamboats passed on the route between Selby or Thorne and Hull. Low tide exposed sand beds, the sand from which was used as ballast for small craft.

The church, dedicated to the Holy Trinity, was designated a Grade II listed building in 1966 and is now recorded in the National Heritage List for England, maintained by Historic England. The church was constructed in 1841 by John Harper, of ashlar masonry with a west tower, Perpendicular-style windows, and a nave with apse at the east. The stability of a previous Blacktoft church was causing concern in the early 1740s. A contemporary court report noted that the chancel of the church had been re-built to a lower height than one existing earlier, resulting in a gap between the top of the new chancel and nave. This gap was closed by stooths—wooden studs or battens—on the exterior of the nave supporting a beam. The court heard that the earlier higher chancel roof had collapsed in the early 1660s as the congregation were leaving the church—this information was treated with scepticism by a prosecutor, but was supported by local masons and carpenters.

The parish register dated from 1700. The Chapelry of Blacktoft had been held by the Bishop of Durham and Durham Monastery—who provided for a stipendiary (paid) priest—up to the reign of Edward VI, this afterwards being granted to a William Jobson, a Hull merchant, who became lay patron (impropriator) of Blacktoft incumbent clergy. Patronage reverted to the Dean and Chapter of Durham Cathedral during the reign of George I.

In the late 18th century the inclosure of land at Blacktoft was enacted by act of Parliament. A further Blacktoft land inclosure act was placed before Parliament in 1830, with this act including the lands of Gilberdyke and Faxfleet.

In early December 2013 Blacktoft, among other regional settlements including Reedness, Saltmarshe, North Ferriby, Hessle and Kingston upon Hull and many more, was subject to flooding due to a tidal surge on the Humber, the largest in 60 years. According to the Environment Agency, damage caused would have been worse had it not been for the Hull Tidal Surge Barrier. A 2014 Flood Investigation Report from East Riding of Yorkshire Council recommended that affected property owners should "develop a personal flood plan". However, improved flood defences are likely to be introduced across the Humber Estuary including the significant raising of the river bank in order to ensure such flooding does not happen again. The Environment Agency expressed confidence in such flood defences being improved by the government in order to prevent flooding re-occurring in the Haltemprice and Howden constituency and across the East Riding of Yorkshire.

References

External links

RSPB Blacktoft Sands. Retrieved 5 July 2014
Blacktoft Parish Council. Retrieved 5 July 2014
"History of Blacktoft, East Yorkshire", Howdenshirehistory.co.uk. Retrieved 5 July 2014
Blacktoft Beacon District Scouting. Retrieved 17 March 2015

Villages in the East Riding of Yorkshire
Civil parishes in the East Riding of Yorkshire